Hugo Leal may refer to:

 Hugo Leal (footballer) (born 1980), Portuguese footballer
 Hugo Leal (politician) (born 1962), Brazilian politician